The Critic is an American prime time animated series revolving around the life of New York film critic Jay Sherman, voiced by actor Jon Lovitz. It was created by writing partners Al Jean and Mike Reiss, who had previously worked as writers and showrunners (seasons 3 and 4) for The Simpsons. The Critic had 23 episodes produced, first broadcast on ABC in 1994, and finishing its original run on Fox in 1995. A revival of webisodes was released online on AtomFilms and Shockwave in 2000 and 2001.

Series overview

Episodes

Season 1 (1994)
The first season aired Wednesdays at 8:30-9:00 pm (EST) on ABC.

The Simpsons Crossover (1995)

Season 2 (1995)
The second season aired Sundays at 8:30-9:00 pm (EST) on Fox. It began following the Simpsons episode "A Star Is Burns", which featured Jay Sherman in what Bart would call a "cheap cartoon crossover." 

{{Episode table
|background=#1532B4
|overall    = 4
|season     = 4
|title      = 15
|director   = 11
|writer     = 15
|airdate    = 11
|prodcode   = 4
|viewers    = 4
|country    = U.S.
|episodes=
{{Episode list
| EpisodeNumber = 14
| EpisodeNumber2 = 1
| Title = Sherman, Woman and Child
| DirectedBy = Bret Haaland
| WrittenBy  = Mike Reiss & Al Jean
| OriginalAirDate = 
| ProdCode = 201
| ShortSummary = In the second season premiere, Jay worries that he may be fired due to Coming Attractions''' low ratings and Duke suddenly being nice to him. He then befriends a single mother from The South named Alice, and develops feelings for her. However, Alice's adulterous, country-singing husband Cyrus (voiced by Sam McMurray) has returned and wants her back.
|Viewers=13.8
| LineColor = 1532B4
}}

}}

 Webisodes (2000–01) 
In early 2000, show creators Al Jean and Mike Reiss wrote a series of ten 3-5 minute long internet webisodes of The Critic, still with Jon Lovitz as the starring role. While still making fun of movies and Hollywood in general, its story focused on Jay lusting after the lovely Jennifer, his new makeup lady (voiced by Valerie Levitt). Alice does not appear in any of the episodes and is not mentioned by name, though Jay does briefly refer to a "second divorce" in the first episode—presumably from her or the Mexican woman he married in order to get to Cuba. Besides Jay, Vlada (voiced by Nick Jameson) is the only other character from the show to make an appearance. Maurice LaMarche and Tress MacNeille are the only other cast members from the show to return alongside Lovitz and Jameson, voicing assorted background characters. MacNeille returned for webisode 10. The episodes were available on AtomFilms.com and Shockwave.com until 2001. All ten of the "webisodes" were included on the complete series DVD (but not iTunes). Parodies include gaffs on The Patriot, Harry Potter, Mission: Impossible 2, X-Men, Pearl Harbor and Cast Away''.

Episodes 1 through 4 were animated by Jet City Studios; 5, 9, and 10 by Unbound Studios; and 6 through 8 by Flinch Studios.

References

Notes

Critic
Critic
The Critic